The Shire of Ilfracombe was a local government area located in central western Queensland, between the towns of Longreach and Barcaldine.

The region formerly located within the shire contains many large cattle and sheep stations. By population, it was one of the smallest local government areas in Queensland.

History 
The Aramac Division was created on 11 November 1879 as one of 74 divisions around Queensland under the Divisional Boards Act 1879. On 27 December 1902, part of the Aramac Division was excised to create the Ilfracombe Division under the Divisional Boards Act 1887.

With the passage of the Local Authorities Act 1902, Ilfracombe Division became the Shire of Ilfracombe on 31 March 1903.

On 15 March 2008, under the Local Government (Reform Implementation) Act 2007 passed by the Parliament of Queensland on 10 August 2007, the Shire of Ilfracombe merged with the Shires of Isisford and Longreach to form the Longreach Region.

Towns and localities 
The Shire of Ilfracombe included the following settlement:

 Ilfracombe (pop. 170)

Chairmen
 1927: A. Howatson

Population

References

External links 

 

Former local government areas of Queensland
2008 disestablishments in Australia
Populated places disestablished in 2008